Tour of Taiyuan is a men's multi-day cycling race which takes place in China. It is rated as a 2.2 event on the UCI Asia Tour.

Past winners

References

Cycle races in China
UCI Asia Tour races
Recurring sporting events established in 2019
2019 establishments in China